Spinball may refer to:

 Sonic Spinball, a 1993 pinball video game developed by Sega Technical Institute and published by Sega
 Spinball Whizzer, a spinning roller coaster located in the Adventure Land area of Alton Towers in Staffordshire, England
 Spinball (video game), a 1983 Vectrex game